Aroga camptogramma is a moth of the family Gelechiidae. It is found in North America, where it has been recorded from Texas and Arizona.

The wingspan is 8–9 mm. The forewings are dark purplish-fuscous with a moderate rather irregularly edged white streak along the dorsum from the base to near the tornus, then proceeding rather obliquely across the wing to the costa. The hindwings are grey, paler anteriorly.

References

Moths described in 1931
Aroga
Moths of North America